Uruguay competed in the 2019 Pan American Games in Lima, Peru from July 26 to August 11, 2019.

On July 1, 2019, sport shooter Julieta Mautone was named as the country's flag bearer during the opening ceremony.

The Uruguayan team consisted of 145 (104 men and 41 women) athletes.

Competitors
The following is the list of number of competitors (per gender) participating at the games per sport/discipline.

Medalists

|  style="text-align:left; vertical-align:top;"|

Athletics

7 athletes are scheduled to compete:

 Déborah Rodríguez (800 m): 3rd place 
 Santiago Catrofe (1500 m) : 4th
 María Pía Fernández (1500 m) : 5th
 Eduardo Gregorio (1500 m) : 13th
 Nicolás Cuestas (marathon): 7th (personal best)
 Lorena Aires (high jump) : 10th
 Emiliano Lasa (long jump): 3rd place

Basque pelota

Men

Women

Beach volleyball

Uruguay qualified a men's pair.

Men
1 Pair (2 athletes)

Bodybuilding

Uruguay qualified a full team of two bodybuilders (one male and one female).

There were no results in the pre-judging stage, with only the top six advancing.

Boxing

Uruguay qualified one male boxer.

Men

Canoeing

Sprint
Uruguay qualified a total of 4 sprint athletes.

Men

Equestrian

Uruguay qualified ten equestrians.

Dressage

Eventing

Jumping

Field hockey

Uruguay qualified a women's team of 16 athletes. The team qualified by being ranked second at the 2018 South American Games.

Women's tournament

Preliminary round

Quarter-finals

Cross over

5th place match

Football

Men's tournament

Uruguay qualified a men's team of 18 athletes.

Golf

Uruguay qualified a full team of four golfers (two men and two women).

Gymnastics

Artistic
Uruguay qualified one male and one female artistic gymnast.

Men

Women

Judo

Uruguay qualified one male judoka.

Men

Modern pentathlon

Uruguay qualified three modern pentathletes (two men and one woman).

Men
2 quotas

Women
1 quota

Rugby sevens

Men's tournament

Pool stage

5th-8th place classification

Shooting

Uruguay qualified five sport shooters (four men and one woman).

Men

Women

Mixed

Surfing

Uruguay qualified two male surfers in the sport's debut at the Pan American Games.

Swimming

5 swimmers are scheduled to compete

 Nicole Frank:
 100 m backstroke: 19th
 200 m freestyle
 200 m medley
 400 m medley
 Enzo Martínez
 50 m freestyle
 100 m freestyle
 Martín Melconian
 100 m breaststroke: 8th (national record in heats)
 200 m breaststroke
 Inés Remersaro
 50 m freestyle
 100 m freestyle
 Micaela Sierra
 100 m breaststroke: 16th
 200 m breaststroke

Weightlifting

Uruguay qualified three weightlifters (two men and one woman).

Men

Women

See also
Uruguay at the 2020 Summer Olympics

References

Nations at the 2019 Pan American Games
Pan American Games
2019